Charles Sherman Ruggles (February 8, 1886 – December 23, 1970) was an American comic character actor. In a career spanning six decades, Ruggles appeared in close to 100 feature films, often in mild-mannered and comic roles.  He was also the elder brother of director, producer, and silent film actor Wesley Ruggles (1889–1972).

Career
Ruggles was born in Los Angeles, California, in 1886. Despite training to be a doctor, Ruggles soon found himself on the stage, appearing in a stock production of Nathan Hale in 1905. At Los Angeles's Majestic Theatre, he played Private Jo Files in L. Frank Baum and Louis F. Gottschalk's musical The Tik-Tok Man of Oz in 1913.

He moved to Broadway to appear in Help Wanted in 1914. His first screen role came in the silent Peer Gynt the following year. Throughout the 1910s and 1920s, Ruggles continued to appear in silent movies, though his passion remained the stage, appearing in long-running productions such as The Passing Show of 1918, The Demi-Virgin and Battling Buttler. One of his most famous stage hits was Queen High, one of his last before a nearly 30-year hiatus, produced in 1926. He also played Peter Braley in Spring Is Here, which ran for 104 performances in 1929.

From 1929, Ruggles appeared in talking pictures. His first was Gentleman of the Press in which he played a comic, alcoholic newspaper reporter. Throughout the 1930s, he was teamed with comic actress Mary Boland in a string of domestic farces, notably If I Had a Million, Six of a Kind, Ruggles of Red Gap, and People Will Talk. Ruggles is best remembered today as the big-game hunter in Bringing Up Baby and billionaire Michael J. "Mike" O'Connor in It Happened on Fifth Avenue.

In 1944, he had a summer radio series, The Charlie Ruggles Show on CBS.
In 1949, Ruggles halted his film career to return to the stage and to move into television. He was the headline character in the TV series The Ruggles (1949–52), a family comedy in which he played a character also called Charlie Ruggles and was again the headline character in the daily sitcom The World of Mr. Sweeney, which ran for 345 episodes in 1954–55.

Ruggles returned to the big screen in 1961, playing Charles McKendrick in The Parent Trap and Mackenzie Savage in The Pleasure of His Company. In the latter film, he reprised the role for which he had won a Tony Award in 1959. In 1963 he memorably played the grandfather of the silent film star Corinne Griffith in Papa's Delicate Condition. Griffith had written the book of her early life on which the film is based.

Ruggles made guest appearances in episodes of various television series through the 1950s and 1960s, such as a time-traveling librarian in "Man from 1997," a 1956 science fiction episode of the television series Conflict, and a 1961 appearance as a wealthy neighbor who offers to finance a European trip for Hassie McCoy on The Real McCoys, in the season 5 episode "Hassie's European Tour". Ruggles had a recurring guest role on The Beverly Hillbillies in the mid-1960s as Lowell Redlings Farquhar, father-in-law of Milburn Drysdale (Raymond Bailey). Ruggles also played Aunt Clara's (Marion Lorne) old flame, the warlock Hedley Partridge, as well as a Mr. Caldwell, whose company marketed soup, in the television series Bewitched. In Wagon Train, he played, Jameson Hershey, the owner of an elderly horse, Herman, that joins up with the wagon train. He played Congressman John Canfield on an episode of The Andy Griffith Show called "Aunt Bee, The Swinger", and appeared as a driving instructor on The Munsters. Ruggles also lent his voice to the Aesop and Son features in Jay Ward's The Rocky and Bullwinkle Show.

One of Ruggles' last television appearances before his death was a starring role in the syndicated television special The Wonder Circus, where he played Charlie Wonder, a retired ringmaster who talked about his life leading a circus.

Personal life
His marriage to Adele Rowland (1914–1916) ended in divorce after two years. He then married Barbara Guillan and they remained married until her death in 1941. He married Marion LaBarba in 1942; the couple remained wed until his death in 1970.

Death
Ruggles died of cancer at Saint John's Health Center in Santa Monica, California, on December 23, 1970 at the age of 84.

He is interred at Forest Lawn Memorial Park in Glendale, California in the Garden of Memory near his brother Wesley Ruggles.

Legacy
Charlie Ruggles has three stars on the Hollywood Walk of Fame: one for his contributions to motion pictures on 6200 Hollywood Boulevard, one for his radio work on 6300 Hollywood Boulevard, and one for television on 1600 Vine Street.

Complete filmography

 The Patchwork Girl of Oz (1914) – Minor Role (unconfirmed)
 The Majesty of the Law (1915) – Lawrence Evans
 Peer Gynt (1915) – The Button Molder
 The Reform Candidate (1915) – Loony Jim
 The Heart Raider (1923) – Gaspard McMahon (an insurance clerk)
 Gentlemen of the Press (1929) – Charlie Haven
 The Lady Lies (1929) – Charlie Tayler
 The Battle of Paris (1929) – Zizi
 Roadhouse Nights (1930) – Willie Bindbugel
 Young Man of Manhattan (1930) – Shorty Ross
 Queen High (1930) – T. Boggs Johns
 Her Wedding Night (1930) – Bertie Bird
 Charley's Aunt (1930) – Lord Fancourt Babberley
 Honor Among Lovers (1931) – Monty Dunn
 The Smiling Lieutenant (1931) – Max
 The Girl Habit (1931) – Charlie Floyd
 The Beloved Bachelor (1931) – Jerry Wells
 Husband's Holiday (1931) – Clyde Saunders
 This Reckless Age (1932) – Goliath Whitney
 One Hour with You (1932) – Adolph
 This Is the Night (1932) – Bunny West
 Make Me a Star (1932) – Charles Ruggles (uncredited)
 Love Me Tonight (1932) – Viscount Gilbert de Varèze
 70,000 Witnesses (1932) – Johnny Moran
 The Night of June 13 (1932) – Philo Strawn
 Trouble in Paradise (1932) – The Major
 Evenings for Sale (1932) – Bimpfl
 If I Had a Million (1932) – Henry Peabody
 Madame Butterfly (1932) – Lt. Barton
 Murders in the Zoo (1933) – Peter Yates
 Terror Aboard (1933) – Blackie Witherspoon
 Melody Cruise (1933) – Pete Wells
 Mama Loves Papa (1933) – Wilbur Todd
 Goodbye Love (1933) – Oswald Groggs
 Girl Without a Room (1933) – Vergil Crock
 Alice in Wonderland (1933) – March Hare
 Six of a Kind (1933) – J. Pinkham Whinney
 Melody in Spring (1934) – Warren Blodgett
 Murder in the Private Car (1934) – Godfrey D. Scott
 Friends of Mr. Sweeney (1934) – Asaph 'Ace' Holliday
 The Pursuit of Happiness (1934) – Aaron Kirkland
 Ruggles of Red Gap (1935) – Egbert Floud
 People Will Talk (1935) – Henry Wilton
 No More Ladies (1935) – Edgar
 The Big Broadcast of 1936 (1935) – Wilbur Sealingsworth
 Anything Goes (1936) – Moonface Martin
 The Preview Murder Mystery (1936) – Charles Ruggles (uncredited)
 Early to Bed (1936) – Chester Beatty
 Hearts Divided (1936) – Henry
 Yours for the Asking (1936) – Sunbather (uncredited)
 Hollywood Boulevard (1936) – Himself – Actor – Cameo Appearance (uncredited)
 Wives Never Know (1936) – Homer Bigelow
 Mind Your Own Business (1936) – Orville Shanks
 Turn Off the Moon (1937) – J. Elliott Dinwiddy
 Exclusive (1937) – Tod Swain
 Bringing Up Baby (1938) – Major Applegate
 Hollywood Handicap (1938, Short) – Himself
 Screen Snapshots Series 17, No. 12 (1938, Documentary short) – Himself
 Breaking the Ice (1938) – Samuel Terwilliger
 Service de Luxe (1938) – Scott Robinson
 His Exciting Night (1938) – Adam Tripp
 Boy Trouble (1939) – Homer C. Fitch
 Sudden Money (1939) – Sweeney J. Patterson
 Invitation to Happiness (1939) – Henry 'Pop' Hardy
 Night Work (1939) – Homer C. Fitch
 Balalaika (1939) – Nicki Popoff
 The Farmer's Daughter (1940) – Nickie North
 Opened by Mistake (1940) – Buzz Nelson
 Maryland (1940) – Dick Piper
 Public Deb No. 1 (1940) – Milburn
 No Time for Comedy (1940) – Philo Swift
 The Invisible Woman (1940) – George
 Honeymoon for Three (1941) – Harvey Wilson
 Model Wife (1941) – Milo Everett
 The Parson of Panamint (1941) – Chuckawalla Bill Redfield
 Go West, Young Lady (1941) – Jim Pendergast
 The Perfect Snob (1941) – Dr. Edgar Mason
 Friendly Enemies (1942) – Heinrich Block
 Dixie Dugan (1943) – Pa Dugan
 The Shining Future (1944, Short) – Mr. Ames
 The Road to Victory (1944, Short) – Mr. Ames (uncredited)
 The Doughgirls (1944) – Stanley Slade
 Our Hearts Were Young and Gay (1944) – Otis Skinner
 Three Is a Family (1944) – Sam Whitaker
 Bedside Manner (1945) – Dr. J.H. 'Doc' Fredericks
 Incendiary Blonde (1945) – Cherokee Jim
 A Stolen Life (1946) – Freddie Linley
 Gallant Journey (1946) – Jim Montgomery
 The Perfect Marriage (1947) – Dale Williams, Sr.
 My Brother Talks to Horses (1947) – Richard Pennington Roeder
 Ramrod (1947) – Ben Dickason
 It Happened on 5th Avenue (1947) – Michael J. O'Connor
 Give My Regards to Broadway (1948) – Toby Helper
 The Lovable Cheat (1949) – Claude Mercadet
 Look for the Silver Lining (1949) – Caro 'Pop' Miller
 Ben and Me (1953, Short) – Ben Franklin (voice, uncredited)
 The Bells of St. Mary's (1959, TV movie) – Horace Bogardus
 Once Upon a Christmas Time (1959, TV movie) – Mayor
 All in a Night's Work (1961) – Dr. Warren Kingsley Sr.
 The Parent Trap (1961) – Charles McKendrick
 The Pleasure of His Company (1961) – Mackenzie Savage
 The Ginger Rogers Show (1961, TV movie) – Eli Harcourt
 Ernestine (1962, TV movie)
 Son of Flubber (1963) – Judge Murdock
 Papa's Delicate Condition (1963) – Anthony Ghio
 I'd Rather Be Rich (1964) – Dr. Charles Crandall
 The Ugly Dachshund (1966) – Dr. J.L. Pruitt
 Follow Me, Boys! (1966) – John Everett Hughes
 Carousel (1967, TV movie) – The Starkeeper / Dr. Selden

Television credits
 Father Knows Best (1960) (1 episode) as Jim's co-worker
 Rocky and His Friends (1960–1961) as Voice of Aesop
 The Bullwinkle Show (1961) as Voice of Aesop
 The Real McCoys (1961) as Mr. Deveraux 
 Burke's Law (1963–1964) as O.B. Danberry / Charles Wingfield / I.A. Bugg / Mr. Gregory 
 My Living Doll (1964, "I'll Leave It to You") as Jonas Clay
 Beverly Hillbillies (1964) as Mrs. Drysdale's father
 Bewitched (1964, episode: "Help Help, Don't Save Me"), and (1965, episode: "Aunt Clara's Old Flame") as Hedley Partridge
 Wagon Train as Mr. Caldwell (1965, episode:"Herman")  
 The Man from U.N.C.L.E. (1965) (1 episode) as Governor Callahan
 The Andy Griffith Show (1965) (episode "Aunt Bee, The Swinger") as John Canfield
 The Munsters (1965) (1 episode, "Herman's Driving Test") as Charlie Wiggens
 Bonanza (1966) (1 episode, "Horse of a Different Hue") as Col. Robert Fairchild
 The Wonder Circus (1966) (television special) as Charlie Wonder
 The Danny Thomas Hour (1968) (1 episode, "One for My Baby") as Stimson

Radio appearances

References

External links

 
 
 
 

1886 births
1970 deaths
20th-century American male actors
American male film actors
American male television actors
American male stage actors
American male radio actors
American male voice actors
Burials at Forest Lawn Memorial Park (Glendale)
People from Greater Los Angeles
Deaths from cancer in California
Male actors from California